One human polls make up the 1997–98 NCAA Division I men's ice hockey rankings, the USA Today/USA Hockey Magazine poll.

Legend

USA Today

USCHO.com

References

1997–98 NCAA Division I men's ice hockey season
College men's ice hockey rankings in the United States